Flavius Syagrius (consul 381), Roman consul in 381
Afranius Syagrius, Roman consul in 382.
Syagrius (430 – 486 or 487) Roman official of the Gallo-Roman enclave of Soissons after the collapse of Western Roman empire.
Saint Syagrius of Autun (died 600), bishop of Autun
Syagrius of Verona, a bishop of Verona  360.